Chingen is a village in the Nicobar district of Andaman and Nicobar Islands, India. It is located in the Great Nicobar tehsil.

Demographics 

The village, inhabited by several Shompen people was severely affected by the 2004 Indian Ocean earthquake and tsunami. According to the 2011 census of India, only 3 households had been left in Chingen (including FC at Magar Nalla). The effective literacy rate (i.e. the literacy rate of population excluding children aged 6 and below) is 25%.

References 

Villages in Great Nicobar tehsil